Zvezda po imeni Solntse is the seventh studio album by the Soviet rock band Kino, released on August 29, 1989. The album was the last album released before lead vocalist Viktor Tsoi's death.

Recording history 
The recording of the draft version of the album took place at Georgy Guryanov, where the group's home studio was located. The recording was made at the same port studio where the previous album was made. The musicians decided to record the final version in a professional studio. For this, the director of the group, Yuri Belishkin, rented the studio of the singer Valery Leontiev in Moscow , where in December 1988 - January 1989 the final version of the album was recorded.

Release history 
The album was first released in 1989 on cassette and reel-to-reel, sold at the band's concerts. It did not receive a proper release until 1993, when Moroz Records released it on vinyl. The 1993 re-release cover art depicts a solar eclipse. In 1995, the album was released in Germany on CD. The album received its first Russian CD release in 1996.

In 2019, the original album was remastered and reissued by Maschina Records. Yuri Kasparyan, and Viktor Tsoi's son, Alexander, were involved in the production and approval process.

Music style 
The Album is destibed as post-punk, new wave and alternative rock with elements of indie rock. The main song, "Zvezda po imeni  Solntse",is a mix of all of this styles/ Every composition in Zvezda po imeni Solntse is sounded in different genres: "Pesnya bez Slov" ― synth rock; "Neveselaya Pesnya" ― folk metal; "Skazka" ― gothic rock; "Mesto dlya Shaga Vperyod" ― funk; "Pachka Sigaret" ― space rock; "Stuk" ― hard rock and alternative metal; "Pechal" ― jangle pop; "Aprile" ― folk rock.

Track listing
Thematically, it is significantly different - the lyrics tell about personal struggles and are filled with reflections on the meaning of life and death.

 "Песня без слов" (Song Without Words) — 5:06
 "Звезда по имени Солнце" (Star Called Sun) — 3:45
 "Невесёлая песня" (Unhappy Song) — 4:18
 "Сказка" (Tale) — 5:58
 "Место для шага вперёд" (Space for a Step Forward) — 3:39
 "Пачка сигарет" (Pack of Cigarettes) — 4:28
 "Стук" (Knock) — 3:50
 "Печаль" (Sadness) — 5:32
 "Апрель" (April) — 4:40

Personnel
Viktor Tsoi – Vocals, Guitar
Yuri Kasparyan – Lead Guitar
Igor Tikhomirov – Bass Guitar
Georgiy Guryanov – Yamaha RX-5

References

External links 

 

1989 albums
Kino (band) albums
Soviet rock music
Russian-language albums